Tuj may refer to:
 Tuj, Hormozgan
 Tuj, South Khorasan
 Tuj, alternate name of Tajag, South Khorasan

See also
 Temple University, Japan Campus (TUJ)